Pabstiella curti-bradei is a species of orchid plant native to Brazil.

References 

curti-bradei
Flora of Brazil